Colonel Richard Ratsimandrava (March 21, 1931 Antananarivo – February 11, 1975 Antananarivo) was President of Madagascar for six days in February 1975 before his assassination in office.

Biography

Military career 
He was born in 1931 and was a Merina from a Merina family. A graduate of the French Saint Cyr military college, Ratsimandrava served throughout French Africa before returning to Madagascar when that country gained independence in 1960. He joined the army, attaining the rank of lieutenant-colonel by 1968. In 1972 President Gabriel Ramanantsoa established a military government to replace the independence government of Philibert Tsiranana, and Ratsimandrava was appointed Minister of the Interior. Several senior officers were able to manipulate the army, which led to the ousting of Ramanantsoa on February 5, 1975.

Death
Six days following his taking office, Ratsimandrava was assassinated at 8 p.m. while driving from the presidential palace to his home. His death was announced by the new ruling military committee. It claimed that the President had been killed by members of the Republican Security Forces (Groupe Mobile de Police-GMP), a counterinsurgency outfit dissolved by his predecessor. The event nearly plunged the country into civil war between supporters of the military government and former President Tsiranana. In 2006, on the 31st anniversary of colonel's murder, a conference was held in Madagascar.

Further reading
L'assassinat du president Ratsimandrava, Le Journal La Croix (1975). preview of newspaper article on assassination of Ratsimandrava

References

External links
Biography - in Malagasy.
- Photo of Ratsimandrava.

1931 births
1975 deaths
People from Antananarivo
Merina people
Malagasy military personnel
Assassinated Malagasy politicians
Assassinated heads of state
People murdered in Madagascar
Interior ministers of Madagascar

20th-century Malagasy people
1975 murders in Africa
1975 crimes in Madagascar